HMS Scipio was a 64-gun third rate ship of the line of the Royal Navy, launched on 22 October 1782 at Deptford. She was broken up in 1798.

Notable people who sailed on her include Matthew Flinders, Francis Laforey, John Nicholson Inglefield and Edward Thornbrough.

Notes

References

 Lavery, Brian (2003) The Ship of the Line - Volume 1: The development of the battlefleet 1650-1850. Conway Maritime Press. .

External links
 

Ships of the line of the Royal Navy
Crown-class ships of the line
1782 ships
Ships built in Deptford